Gymnotocinclus is a genus of small freshwater catfish in the family Loricariidae, native to the Tocantins River basin in Brazil.

Species
There are two species in the genus:

 Gymnotocinclus anosteos 
 Gymnotocinclus canoeiro

References

Hypoptopomatini
Fish of Brazil
Catfish genera
Freshwater fish genera
Taxa named by Tiago Pinto Carvalho
Taxa named by Pablo Cesar Lehmann-Albornoz
Taxa named by Roberto Esser dos Reis